The white-footed vole (Arborimus albipes) is a species of rodent in the family Cricetidae. It is found only in the United States. Its natural habitat is temperate forests.

Sources

Arborimus
Mammals of the United States
Mammals described in 1901
Taxonomy articles created by Polbot
Taxa named by Clinton Hart Merriam